"Sick Again" is a song by English rock band Led Zeppelin from their 1975 album Physical Graffiti. It was written by singer Robert Plant. The song is about a group of teen groupies, which Plant referred to them as "L.A. Queens", with whom the band were acquainted on their 1973 US Tour.

Lyrics
Plant took pity upon these girls who would flock to the hotel rooms of the band to offer them "favors". In an interview he gave in 1975, he provided an explanation of the lyrics:

Live performances
Led Zeppelin frequently performed "Sick Again" in concert; during the 1975 and 1977 tours, it was often the second song they played. A performance from the 1979 Knebworth Festival is included on the Led Zeppelin DVD (2003). The song was dropped for the band's final tour Over Europe in 1980.

Page performed this song on his tour with the Black Crowes in 1999. A version of "Sick Again" performed by them can be found on the album Live at the Greek.

Personnel 

 Robert Plant - vocals
 Jimmy Page - guitar
 John Bonham - drums, percussion
 John Paul Jones - bass

References

1975 songs
Songs about teenagers
Songs about groupies
Led Zeppelin songs
Song recordings produced by Jimmy Page
Songs written by Jimmy Page
Songs written by Robert Plant